The 1991–92 Kent Football League season was the 26th in the history of the Kent Football League, a football competition in England.

The league was won by Herne Bay, while Thames Polytechnic left the league after seven seasons. Metropolitan Police resigned from the league during the season and their record was expunged.

League Table

The league featured 20 clubs which competed in the previous season, along with two new clubs:
Corinthian, relegated from the Southern League
Thamesmead Town, transferred from the Spartan League

Also, Danson changed name to Danson Furness United.

League table

References

External links

1991-92
1991–92 in English football leagues